The Calves Head Club was purportedly established to ridicule the memory of Charles I of England. Toward the end of the seventeenth century, rumors began circulating in print about the club and its annual meeting held on 30 January, the anniversary of the execution of Charles I by decapitation.

The club is mentioned by Samuel Wesley, a dissenter who later conformed to the Anglican Church, in the anonymous A Letter from a Country Divine to his Friend in London Concerning the Education of Dissenters in their Private Academies (1703). Wesley claimed to have attended  a meeting in 1693 where dissenters blasphemed the memory of Charles I, "discoursing of their Calves-head Club" and a "Design they had at their next Calves-Head Feast, to have a Cold Pye serv'd on the Table, with either a Live-Cat or Hare ... and they had contriv'd to put one of their Company who lov'd Monarchy, and knew nothing of the matter, to cut it up; whereupon, and on the leaping out of the Cat or Hare, they were all to set up a Shout, and cry, Haloo! Old Puss!—to the Honour of the Good Old Cause, and to shew their affection to a Commonwealth." Wesley's biographer Henry D. Rack comments, "It was probably not, as is usually claimed, a meeting of the so-called Calve's Head Club, whose reputation in any case may owe much to tory propaganda. ... Publication was timed to reinforce the current attacks on dissenters and especially on their academies."

The main source for propaganda concerning the Calves' Head Club was the popular work written at least in some part by Tory sympathizer Edward Ward (1667–1731), The secret history of the Calves-Head Club, or The Republican unmasqu'd, wherein is fully shewn the religion of the Calves-Head heroes, in their anniversary thanksgiving songs on the thirtieth of January, by them called anthems; for the years 1693, 1694, 1695, 1696, 1697. Now published, to demonstrate the restless, implacable spirit of a certain party still among us, who are never to be satisfied till the present establishment in church and state is subverted. The work was published in 1703 and reprinted fifteen times between 1703 and 1721. "I was inform'd," the narrator relates,

According to The Secret History, after the banquet a copy of the Eikon Basilike (the "Royal Portrait," supposedly printed from the diary of Charles I) was burned while "anthems" were sung. A calf's skull was filled with wine or another liquor and members toasted "The Pious Memory of those worthy Patriots that had kill'd the Tyrant, and deliver'd their Country from his Arbitrary Sway."

According to the Encyclopædia Britannica Eleventh Edition, the club survived till 1734, when the diners were mobbed owing to the popular ill-feeling which their outrages on good taste provoked, and the riot which ensued put a final stop to the meetings.

See also

 Secret society

References

Further reading
 
 
 
 
 

Clubs and societies in London
Secret societies in the United Kingdom
Stuart England
Charles I of England
Organizations established in 1649
1734 disestablishments in England
1649 establishments in England